The Antrim Senior Hurling Championship (known for sponsorship reasons as the Bathshack.com Antrim Senior Hurling Championship  and abbreviated to the Antrim SHC) is an annual club hurling competition organised by the Antrim County Board of the Gaelic Athletic Association. It is contested by the top-ranking senior clubs in the county of Antrim, Northern Ireland, with the winners decided through a group and knockout format. It is the most prestigious competition in Antrim hurling.

In its present format, the eight teams are drawn into two groups of four teams and play each other in a single round-robin system. The two group winners proceed to the knockout phase that culminates with the final. The winner of the Antrim Senior Championship, as well as being presented with the Volunteer Cup, qualifies for the subsequent Ulster Club Championship.

The competition has been won by 19 teams, 15 of which have won it more than once. Loughgiel Shamrocks is the most successful team in the tournament's history, having won it 20 times. Dunloy are the reigning champions, having beaten Cushenall by 1-20 to 2–11 in the 2022 final.

Commonly the final takes place at Antrim's county stadium, Casement Park. However, on account of the ground's ongoing redevelopment the 2013 and 2014 finals were held at Páirc Mac Uílín in Ballycastle. The 2015 final was held at Dunloy's Pearse Park, due to McQuillan Ballycastle's appearance in the decider.

Wins listed by club

Finals listed by year

Records and statistics

Teams

By decade
The most successful team of each decade, judged by number of Antrim SHC titles, is as follows:

 1970s: 3 each for O'Donovan Rossa (1972-76-77) and McQuillans Ballycastle (1975-78-79)
 1980s: 4 for McQuillans Ballycastle (1980-83-84-86)
 1990s: 5 each for Dunloy (1990-94-95-97-98) and Ruairí Óg (1991-92-93-96-99)
 2000s: 6 for Dunloy (2000-01-02-03-07-09)
 2010s: 5 for Loughgiel Shamrocks (2010-11-12-13-16)

References

External links
 Official Antrim GAA Website
 Antrim Club GAA

 
Hurling competitions in County Antrim
Hurling competitions in Northern Ireland
Hurling competitions in Ulster
Senior hurling county championships